Lloyd Morgan (born 15 April 1945) is a Jamaican cricketer. He played in four first-class matches for the Jamaican cricket team from 1968 to 1973.

See also
 List of Jamaican representative cricketers

References

External links
 

1945 births
Living people
Jamaican cricketers
Jamaica cricketers
Sportspeople from Kingston, Jamaica